The Brooklyn Nets are an American professional basketball team based in the New York City borough of Brooklyn. The Nets compete in the National Basketball Association (NBA) as a member of the Atlantic Division of the Eastern Conference. The team plays its home games at Barclays Center. They are one of two NBA teams located in New York City; the other is the New York Knicks. The club was established in 1967 as a charter franchise of the NBA's rival league, the American Basketball Association (ABA). They played in New Jersey as the New Jersey Americans during their first season, before relocating to Long Island, New York, in 1968 and changing their name to the New York Nets. During this time, the Nets won two ABA championships (in 1974 and 1976). In 1976, the ABA merged with the NBA, and the Nets were absorbed into the NBA along with three other ABA teams (the San Antonio Spurs, Indiana Pacers, and Denver Nuggets), all of whom remain in the league to this day.

In 1977, the team returned to New Jersey and played as the New Jersey Nets from 1977 to 2012. Led by star point guard Jason Kidd, the Nets reached the NBA Finals in two consecutive NBA seasons (2001–02 and 2002–03), but failed to win a championship. In the summer of 2012, the team moved to Barclays Center in Brooklyn, becoming the first major sports franchise in the borough since the departure of the Brooklyn Dodgers baseball team in 1957. Since moving to Brooklyn, the Nets have qualified for the playoffs on seven occasions, including trips to the Conference Semifinals in 2014 and 2021.

History

The Brooklyn Nets were founded in 1967 and initially played in Teaneck, New Jersey, as the New Jersey Americans. In its early years, the team led a nomadic existence, moving to Long Island in 1968 and playing in various arenas there as the New York Nets.

Led by Hall of Famer Julius "Dr. J" Erving, the Nets won two ABA championships in New York before becoming one of four ABA teams to be admitted into the NBA as part of the ABA–NBA merger in 1976. Unlike the other three ABA teams entering the NBA, who played in cities without any NBA presence, the Nets were required by the NBA to pay an "encroachment fee" of $4.8million (equivalent to $million in ) to the New York Knicks. The team financed that payment by selling Erving's contract to the Philadelphia 76ers; and the Nets went from winning the last ABA title in 1975–76 to having the worst record in the NBA in 1976–77. The team then moved back to New Jersey in 1977 and became the New Jersey Nets. During their time in the state, the Nets played in two consecutive NBA Finals in the 2001–02 and 2002–03 seasons, led on the court by point guard Jason Kidd.

After playing 35 seasons in New Jersey, the team moved back to the state of New York, changed its geographic name to Brooklyn, and began playing in the new Barclays Center, starting with the 2012–13 NBA season. The team's move from New Jersey to Brooklyn was approved unanimously by the NBA Board of Governors on April 13, 2012.

Rivalries

Boston Celtics
During the early 2000s, the Nets were led by Jason Kidd and Kenyon Martin, while the Boston Celtics were experiencing newfound success behind Paul Pierce and Antoine Walker. The rivalry began to heat up in the 2002 Eastern Conference Finals, which was preceded by trash-talking from the Celtics, who claimed Martin was a "fake" tough guy. Things progressed as the series started, and on-court tensions seemed to spill into the stands. Celtic fans berated Kidd and his family with chants of "Wife Beater!" in response to Kidd's 2001 domestic abuse charge. When the series returned to New Jersey, Nets fans responded, with some brandishing signs that read "Will someone please stab Paul Pierce?" referring to a night club incident in 2000 in which Pierce was stabbed 11 times. When asked about the fan barbs being traded, Kenyon Martin stated, "Our fans hate them, their fans hate us." Bill Walton said at the time that Nets-Celtics was the "beginning of the next great NBA rivalry" during the Eastern Conference Finals in 2002. Led by Kidd, the Nets advanced to the NBA Finals, and the following year, swept Boston in the 2003 playoffs.

On November 28, 2012, there were indications that the rivalry might be rekindled when an altercation occurred on the court, resulting in the ejection of Rajon Rondo, Gerald Wallace, and Kris Humphries. Rondo was suspended for two games in the aftermath, while Wallace and Kevin Garnett were fined. The story was revisited on December 25, when Wallace grabbed Garnett's shorts and the two had to be broken up by referees and players alike.

In the 2019 NBA off-season, the Nets signed point guard Kyrie Irving. Coming off two seasons with the Celtics, Irving was described as selfish by many critics. This impression caused many Celtics fans to blame him for the Celtics' inability to get through to the playoffs.

During a regular season game in the 2019–20 season between the Celtics and Nets, the Celtics' fans displayed their displeasure with Irving by chanting "Kyrie sucks" in TD Garden. When the series returned to Brooklyn two days later, the Nets' fans chanted "Kyrie's better" in response to the chants in Boston. The "Kyrie's Better" chants reference to how the Celtics signed Kemba Walker after Irving left for the Nets.

On May 30, 2021, a fan threw a water bottle at Irving at TD Garden following a Nets victory and a 3-1 lead in the series.

New York Knicks

The Knicks–Nets rivalry has historically been a geographical one, with the Knicks playing in Madison Square Garden in the New York City borough of Manhattan, while the Nets played in the suburban area of Long Island and in New Jersey, and since 2012 have been playing at Barclays Center in Brooklyn. Media outlets have noted the Knicks–Nets rivalry's similarity to those of other New York City teams, such as the Major League Baseball (MLB) Subway Series rivalry between the American League (AL)'s New York Yankees and the National League (NL)'s New York Mets, and the National Football League (NFL) rivalry between the National Football Conference (NFC)'s New York Giants and the American Football Conference (AFC)'s New York Jets, the result of the boroughs' proximity through the New York City subway. Historically, the boroughs of Manhattan and Brooklyn competed via the Dodgers–Giants rivalry, when the two teams were the Brooklyn Dodgers and the New York Giants. Like the Knicks and Nets, the Giants and Dodgers played in Manhattan and Brooklyn, respectively, and were fierce intraleague rivals. The rivalry between the New York Islanders and New York Rangers of the National Hockey League took on a similar dimension while the Islanders inhabited the Barclays Center, from 2015 to 2021. Due to the Knicks being located in Manhattan and the Nets being located in Brooklyn, some media outlets have dubbed this rivalry "Clash of the Boroughs".

Toronto Raptors

A rivalry with the Toronto Raptors began in 2004, after Raptors guard/forward Vince Carter was traded to the New Jersey Nets. However, the two teams did not meet in the playoffs until 2007, when the Nets defeated the Raptors in the first round series, 4 games to 2, after a go-ahead shot by Richard Jefferson with 8 seconds left in Game 6 led to a 98–97 victory. Seven years later, the teams met again in the first round, and the series went to seven games, with a game-winning block by Paul Pierce, giving the Nets the 104–103 victory. The series was noted for controversy when Toronto Raptors general manager Masai Ujiri made derogatory remarks towards Brooklyn at a fan rally outside Maple Leaf Square in Toronto before Game 1. Ujiri later apologized at halftime. The Raptors and Nets faced each other in the 2020 NBA playoffs in the first round, with Toronto winning the series four games to none.

Season-by-season record
List of the last five seasons completed by the Nets. For the full season-by-season history, see List of Brooklyn Nets seasons.

Note: GP = Games played, W = Wins, L = Losses, W–L% = Winning percentage

Uniforms

New Jersey Americans
Upon debuting in the ABA in 1967, the New Jersey Americans wore white and red uniforms. The white uniforms contained red, blue and white stripes, with the team name and numerals in red with blue trim. The red uniforms mirror the striping configurations of the white uniforms while the city name and numerals were in blue with white trim.

New York Nets

1968–1972
Moving to Long Island as the New York Nets, they kept the original Americans template except for the location and team name. The white uniforms featured a script "Nets" lettering with a tail accent below, while the red uniforms featured "New York" in block letters (similar to the New York Knicks). Over the years, the letters and stripes would endure a few adjustments.

1972–1977
The Nets changed uniforms upon moving to Nassau Coliseum. The white uniforms featured a thick blue stripe with white stars on the left, along with a red stripe and white outline. The team name is written in red block letters. The blue uniforms, which featured "New York" in white block letters, mirrored that of the white uniforms.

New Jersey Nets

1977–1981; 1983–1990
The Nets carried the "Stars and Stripes" uniform to New Jersey in 1977. The white uniform remained the same but the blue uniform read "Nets" in front. The blue uniform later added "New Jersey" in white block letters inside the red stripe.

1981–1983
Upon moving to the Meadowlands in 1981, the Nets briefly changed their uniform set. The white uniform brought back the "Nets" script from the original New York Nets uniforms, but the color scheme became blue with red trim. The blue uniform featured "New Jersey" stacked together in a similar script style, and the letters were colored in red with white trim.

1990–1997
The Nets underwent a visual rebrand before the 1990–91 season. The white uniform featured a more futuristic "Nets" script in red with white and blue trim, while adding red and blue stripes. Initially, the Nets wore white and light blue gradient road uniforms that had a tie-dye effect, but switched to a solid blue uniform after only one season. Both blue uniforms featured the same "Nets" script in red with blue and white trim along with red and white stripes.

1997–2012
The Nets updated their visual identity prior to the 1997–98 season, going with a deeper red and navy scheme with silver accents. The white uniform, which remained virtually unchanged throughout its history, featured the team name in navy with silver and red trim. The navy uniform featured the city name in silver with navy and red trim. The dark grey alternate uniform, used until 2006, initially went with the city name in navy with white and red trim, but reversed the color scheme to white with red and navy trim after only two seasons. This uniform was the only one to feature the "NJ" alternate logo on the neckline. The red alternate uniform, which replaced the grey alternate and became the primary dark uniform in 2009, featured the team name in white with navy and silver trim. All uniforms featured thick navy and silver argyle stripes.

Brooklyn Nets

2012–2017
Upon moving to Brooklyn in 2012, the Nets went with a simple black and white uniform design, with "Brooklyn" in front of both the white and black uniforms. They also wore three different alternate uniforms. A grey-sleeved alternate with "Brooklyn" in Dodger blue, was first used in 2013 as a visual recall to the Brooklyn Dodgers. A white-sleeved alternate with the team name in black, featured the same "Stars and Stripes" look from the 1970s. A dark grey sleeveless alternate, meant to recall the 1980s New Jersey Nets uniforms, featured the team name in white and the city name in white written inside a black stripe.

2017–present
With the switch from Adidas to Nike, the Nets kept most aspects of their visual identity intact. The white uniform became the "Association" uniform while the black uniform became the "Icon" uniform. The Nets have had three different versions of the "Statement" uniform. The first set, with "BKLYN" in white, was in dark grey and featured the same stars and stripes look from the 1970s. The uniform was updated in 2019 to a lighter grey base and black/dark grey stripes, with "BKLYN" written in graffiti style designed by Eric Haze. In 2022, the Nets again changed its "Statement" uniform, this time with a black base, black letters with silver trim, and a subtle greyscale herringbone striping with three black stars on the left.

The Nets also employed a fourth uniform option: the "City" uniform. The 2017–18 black "City" uniform featured the full team name spelled in white along with grey accents inspired from the Brooklyn Bridge. The following season, it was replaced with a black uniform featuring stylized Brooklyn camo patterns as a tribute to The Notorious B.I.G. For 2019–20, the Nets wore white versions of the "Biggie" uniforms, but with Haze-designed "BED-STUY" graffiti lettering in front (a reference to Bedford–Stuyvesant where The Notorious B.I.G. grew up). The 2020–21 "City" uniform, which honors Brooklyn-born artist Jean-Michel Basquiat, is predominantly black and features "BKLYN NETS" written in Basquiat's style along with multi-colored striping. The Basquiat-inspired "City" uniform returned in 2022–23 but in a white base.

In the 2021–22 season, the Nets' "City" uniform featured visual references to the Nets' uniform history. The navy base and white and silver argyle stripes recalled the 1997–2009 uniforms. The "Nets" wordmark and lettering were taken from the 1990–97 uniforms. A red stripe with white stars honored the "Stars and Stripes" uniform of the 1970s and 1980s. A modified version of the 1980s New Jersey Nets logo, replacing the New Jersey outline with the map of Brooklyn, was added to the right leg. The 1997–2012 shield logo, also tweaked to feature the current "B" alternate logo, was added on the waist.

A fifth uniform option, the "Earned" uniform, is released occasionally and is exclusive only to the teams who qualified in the NBA playoffs the previous year. The Nets, by virtue of qualifying in the 2020 NBA playoffs, were given an "Earned" uniform. The design featured the herringbone parquet style of the Barclays Center court in shades of black and grey, with Helvetica lettering inspired from the signs found at the New York City Subway.

Culture

Mascot

The mascot of the New Jersey Nets was Sly the Silver Fox, who debuted on October 31, 1997 as part of the rebranding of the Nets for the 1997–98 season. Prior to that, the Nets' mascot was an anthropomorphic dragon named Duncan the Dragon.

After the Nets' move to Brooklyn, the team introduced a new superhero mascot named BrooklyKnight (a pun on the demonym "Brooklynite") on November 3, 2012. In his first appearance, he was lowered from the ceiling of Barclays Center amid sparks and fanfare and introduced by Nets public address announcer David Diamante: "Here to defend Brooklyn, he's the BrooklyKnight." The mascot was co-created by Marvel Entertainment, a sister company to NBA broadcasters ABC and ESPN. The character also starred in 32-page comic book published by Marvel titled BrooklyKnight #1, written by Jason Aaron with art by Mike Deodato. After the Nets' second season in Brooklyn, the BrooklyKnight mascot was retired, leaving the Nets mascotless.

Team anthem
On November 3, 2012, the Nets introduced a new team anthem titled "Brooklyn: Something To Lean On", written and recorded by Brooklyn-born musician John Forté. The song is notable for its refrain, which features the "Brooklyn" chant that has been popular with fans in the Barclays Center.

Brooklyn Brigade

The Brooklyn Brigade is a group of fans who are known for their loud chants and passionate attitude towards the Nets. The group was founded in November 2012 by Nets fan and Brooklyn native Udong "Bobby" Edemeka. Edemeka attended a few early season games of the team in their new Brooklyn home. Edemeka noticed that the team lacked a solid fan base in their new home, and decided to purchase tickets for a small group of roughly 20 fans who he noticed were regular followers of the team on the SB Nation online blog, NetsDaily.

The Brigade was not yet based in Section 114. Instead, Edemeka would purchase tickets in whichever section he could, which often included nosebleed seats. The Brigade initially did not get much recognition from the Nets. Edemeka met with the CEO Irina Pavlova (of the ONEXIM Group), who was fond of the group's antics. Although Pavlova was a supporter of the group, other members of the organization were resistant to showing support for the Brigade. During the 2014-2015 NBA season, however, the Brooklyn Nets organization began assigning seats to the Brigade in Section 114 of the Barclays Center. This section is adjacent to the press booth and gave the Brooklyn Brigade exposure on a regional level and then eventually on a national level.

During the Eastern Conference semi-finals in 2014, while the Nets battled the Miami Heat, Brooklyn Nets and Barclays Center CEO Brett Yomark noticed the Brigade's effect on the arena, and he started to visit Section 114 distributing Nets' apparel. In 2016, the Nets hired Sean Marks as their general manager, who became an immediate supporter of the group. During the 2018-2019 season, the Nets reserved section 114 for passionate fans, and called it "The BK Block." Although the Brigade is an independent fan group of the Nets, The Block comprises mostly Brigade members.

Mr. Whammy
Bruce Reznick, known commonly as "Mr. Whammy", is an iconic 86-year-old Nets superfan. Reznick became a Nets season ticket holder in 1998 when the Nets played in Continental Airlines Arena. He is known for his signature "whammy", a practice in which he stands on the sidelines in view of opposing players while they are attempting free throws and tries to distract them with pointing, jumping, and yelling. Reznick will not "whammy" players that have previously played for the Nets. Reznick believes the practice is effective as Barclays Center often has one of the lowest opposing team free throw percentages in the league. For example, by January 11, 2023, opposing teams had only a 70.3 free throw shot percentage in Brooklyn, which was about eight points lower than league average for the 2022–23 NBA season. Before Reznick was given the name "Mr. Whammy" by Nets broadcaster Ian Eagle he was referred to as "Red Shirt".

Management
On September 18, 2019, Joseph Tsai, the executive vice chairman of the Alibaba Group, completed the acquisition of full ownership of the Brooklyn Nets. With the closing of the transaction, Tsai became NBA Governor of the Nets and its affiliates. Additionally, former Turner Broadcasting president David Levy was named CEO of the Nets and Barclays Center. On November 12, the Nets and Barclays Center announced that David Levy would step down from the CEO position he had assumed less than two months before. Oliver Weisberg, president of Tsai's holding company J Tsai Sports, assumed an interim CEO role.

Ownership history
The original owner of the Nets franchise was trucking magnate Arthur J. Brown, who founded the team in 1967. The next year, Brown sold the team for $1.1 million to entrepreneur Roy Boe. Due to financial losses suffered while the team was on Long Island, Boe moved the team back to New Jersey in 1977 and sold the team a year later to a group of seven local businessmen led by Alan N. Cohen and Joseph Taub, who became known as the "Secaucus Seven".

After a lengthy ownership of the franchise and numerous unsuccessful attempts to improve the financial situation of the team, the "Secaucus Seven" finally sold the team in 1998 to a group of local real estate developers led by Raymond Chambers and Lewis Katz, who called themselves the "Community Youth Organization" and wanted to move the team to Newark, New Jersey. The next year the group signed an agreement with New York Yankees owner George Steinbrenner to form YankeeNets, a holding company that owned the two teams, and later also the New Jersey Devils, and increase leverage in future broadcast contracts by negotiating together. After receiving offers from several broadcast partners, including Cablevision, which held their rights at that time, YankeeNets decided to launch its own regional sports television called the YES Network.

YankeeNets failed in its attempts to secure a deal with Newark to construct a new arena in the city. By that point in time, tensions between the management of the Yankees, Nets, and the Devils had cause a rift between them, and a decision was made to split the group. With their plan to move the Nets dead, the Community Youth Organization placed the team up for sale. After a short bidding process, the group secured a deal in 2004 with real estate developer Bruce Ratner to buy the team for $300 million, defeating a similar offer by Charles Kushner and Senator Jon Corzine of New Jersey. Ratner had purchased the team with the intent of moving it to a new arena in Brooklyn, which was to be a centerpiece of the large-scale Atlantic Yards development.

Rapper Jay-Z owned a small minority stake in the Nets from 2003 until 2013. Jay-Z was a leader in the marketing for the team and helped encourage their move from New Jersey to the Barclays Center in Brooklyn, in which he also held a stake. He relinquished his stake after registering as a sports agent with his new agency Roc Nation Sports, to avert any potential conflicts of interest. His shares were eventually sold to singer, rapper, actor and entrepreneur Will Pan, making Pan the first American of Taiwanese descent to own a U.S. professional sports franchise.

On September 24, 2009, Mikhail Prokhorov, Russia's third-richest man according to Forbes, confirmed his intention to become majority owner of the Nets. Prokhorov sent an offer to the team owners requesting that the controlling shares of the basketball club be sold to his company, Onexim, for a symbolic price. In return, Prokhorov funded a loan of $700 million for the construction of Barclays Center, and attracted additional funds from Western banks. Prokhorov stated that he initiated the deal to help push Russian basketball to a new level of development. On May 11, 2010, following approval from the other owners of NBA teams, Prokhorov had become the principal owner of the Nets.

In late 2017, Prokhorov agreed to sell a 49% stake in the team to Joseph Tsai, with an option for Tsai to become the majority owner. The option was exercised in August 2019, with Tsai also buying the Nets' arena, Barclays Center, from Prokhorov for nearly $1 billion in a separate deal. The NBA Board of Governors unanimously approved the sale to Tsai on September 18, 2019.

Facilities

Home arenas
Source:

Practice facilities
The Nets' practice facility and headquarters for the team's basketball operations are located at the Hospital for Special Surgery Training Center in the Industry City complex in the Sunset Park neighborhood of Brooklyn. The facility opened on February 17, 2016, and is built on the roof of an empty warehouse in the complex, occupying 70,000 square feet of space in total. The renovation project cost roughly $50 million. The opening of the training center completed the Nets' move to Brooklyn.

The team's previous practice facility was at the 65,000-square-foot PNY Center in East Rutherford, New Jersey, which opened in 1998. Prior to that, the team practiced at the APA Recreation Center in North Bergen, New Jersey, sharing their lockers and practice courts with truck drivers who used the facility, and at Ramapo College in Mahwah, New Jersey.

In the aftermath of Hurricane Sandy in November 2012, PNY Center suffered a power outage and extensive water damage due to flooding, and for several months, the team used the smaller training spaces and practice courts inside the Barclays Center instead.

Players and coaches

Current roster

Retained draft rights
The Nets hold the draft rights to the following unsigned draft picks who have been playing outside the NBA. A drafted player, either an international draftee or a college draftee who is not signed by the team that drafted him, is allowed to sign with any non-NBA team. In this case, the team retains the player's draft rights in the NBA until one year after the player's contract with the non-NBA team ends. This list includes draft rights that were acquired from trades with other teams.

Franchise leaders
Bold denotes still active with the team. Italics denotes still active, but not with the team. "Name*" includes combined statistics for the team from both the ABA and NBA.

Points scored (regular season) as of the end of the 2020–21 season

 Brook Lopez (10,444)
 Buck Williams (10,440)
 Vince Carter (8,834)
 Richard Jefferson (8,507)
 Jason Kidd (7,373)
 John Williamson* (7,202)
 Julius Erving* (7,104)
 Kerry Kittles (7,096)
 Derrick Coleman (6,930)
 Chris Morris (6,762)
 Mike Gminski (6,415)
 Billy Paultz* (6,297)
 Bill Melchionni* (6,230)
 Otis Birdsong (5,968)
 Keith Van Horn (5,700)
 Albert King (5,595)
 Kendall Gill (4,932)
 Darwin Cook (4,699)
 Kenny Anderson (4,655)
 Deron Williams (4,609)

Other statistics (regular season) as of the end of the 2020–21 season

Retired numbers

 The NBA retired Bill Russell's No. 6 for all its member teams on August 11, 2022.

Basketball Hall of Famers

Notes

FIBA Hall of Fame

Notes

Individual awards

NBA

NBA Rookie of the Year
 Buck Williams – 1982
 Derrick Coleman – 1991

NBA Executive of the Year
 Rod Thorn – 2002

NBA Sportsmanship Award
 Patty Mills – 2022

J. Walter Kennedy Citizenship Award
 Wayne Ellington – 2016

All-NBA First Team
 Jason Kidd – 2002, 2004

All-NBA Second Team
 Buck Williams – 1983
 Jason Kidd – 2003
 Kevin Durant – 2022

All-NBA Third Team
 Derrick Coleman – 1993, 1994
 Dražen Petrović – 1993
 Stephon Marbury – 2000
 Kyrie Irving – 2021

NBA All-Defensive First Team
 Jason Kidd – 2002, 2006

NBA All-Defensive Second Team
 Buck Williams – 1988
 Jason Kidd – 2003–2005, 2007

NBA All-Rookie First Team
 Bernard King – 1978
 Buck Williams – 1982
 Derrick Coleman – 1991
 Keith Van Horn – 1998
 Kenyon Martin – 2001
 Brook Lopez – 2009
 Mason Plumlee – 2014

NBA All-Rookie Second Team
 Chris Morris – 1989
 Kerry Kittles – 1997
 Richard Jefferson – 2002
 Nenad Krstić – 2004
 Marcus Williams – 2007
 MarShon Brooks – 2012
 Bojan Bogdanović – 2015

ABA

ABA Most Valuable Player
 Julius Erving – 1974–1976

ABA Playoffs Most Valuable Player
 Julius Erving – 1974, 1976

ABA Rookie of the Year
 Brian Taylor – 1973

All-ABA Team First Team
 Rick Barry – 1971, 1972
 Bill Melchionni – 1972
 Julius Erving – 1974–1976

All-ABA Team Second Team
 Brian Taylor – 1975

ABA All-Defensive Team
 Mike Gale – 1974
 Brian Taylor – 1975, 1976
 Julius Erving – 1976

ABA All-Rookie Team
 John Roche – 1972
 Jim Chones – 1973
 Brian Taylor – 1973
 Larry Kenon – 1974
 John Williamson – 1974
 Kim Hughes – 1976

NBA All-Star Weekend

NBA All-Star Game
 Buck Williams – 1982, 1983, 1986
 Otis Birdsong – 1984
 Micheal Ray Richardson – 1985
 Kenny Anderson – 1994
 Derrick Coleman – 1994
 Jayson Williams – 1998
 Stephon Marbury – 2001
 Jason Kidd – 2002–2004, 2007, 2008
 Kenyon Martin – 2004
 Vince Carter – 2005–2007
 Devin Harris – 2009
 Deron Williams – 2012
 Brook Lopez – 2013
 Joe Johnson – 2014
 D'Angelo Russell – 2019
 Kevin Durant – 2021, 2022, 2023
 James Harden – 2021, 2022
 Kyrie Irving – 2021, 2023

NBA All-Star Game head coaches
 Byron Scott – 2002

NBA D-League/G League affiliation
The Nets signed an agreement with the Springfield Armor to become its exclusive NBA Development League affiliate starting in the 2011–12 season. This made the Nets the second team to opt for a D-League "hybrid affiliation", the first being the Houston Rockets with the Rio Grande Valley Vipers. Springfield ownership maintained control over business, marketing, and day-to-day operations, with the Nets having control over coaching and player decisions. This hybrid model was well received by GMs and owners. However, after three seasons, the Detroit Pistons purchased the Armor from its former owners, and moved and renamed the team the Grand Rapids Drive.

On November 6, 2015, the Nets announced that they had purchased a new D-League team to be called the Long Island Nets. The team played their home games during the 2016–17 season at the Barclays Center and then at the Nassau Coliseum in Uniondale, New York after renovations were complete for the 2017–18 season. The Long Island Nets became the twelfth D-League team to be owned by an NBA team.

Media

The television home of the Nets is currently the YES Network, which the team helped create while they were under the corporate umbrella of YankeeNets LLC, a merger of business operations between the Nets and the New York Yankees. After the dissolution of YankeeNets and Bruce Ratner's purchase of the team, YES signed a long-term deal to keep broadcasting Nets games. The sale to the Ratner group did not include the percentage of YES that was previously owned by the Nets, which remains with the pre-merger Nets owners. Prior to that, the Nets' TV home was Fox Sports Net New York and SportsChannel New York.

Select playoff games air over-the-air on WWOR-TV instead of on YES, this is only when Yankees games are airing at the same time. Previously these games aired on WLNY-TV or WPIX.

The current flagship radio station of the Nets is WFAN, which took over the radio rights to the Nets after losing their basketball contract with the Knicks (who moved to WEPN). Prior to that, Nets games aired on WNEW, WMCA, WVNJ, WNBC, WQEW, and WOR.

In the club's early ABA years, some Sunday road games were televised in a package carried by WPIX. The team's later ABA tenure featured more frequent road telecasts on their current broadcast partner, WWOR-TV. Known then as WOR-TV, it continued airing road games for a time once the team joined the NBA in 1976.

Television
Ian Eagle has been the sole television play-by-play announcer for the Nets since the departure of Marv Albert in 2011. Eagle became the lead television voice for the team in 1995 after serving as the team's radio voice for one year, while Albert joined the Nets following his firing by MSG Network in 2005 after four decades as the lead voice of the New York Knicks. When Albert joined the broadcast team, he became the lead broadcaster with Eagle as his substitute; beginning in the 2009–10 season, due to Albert's advancing age and his other commitments, Eagle once again assumed the lead play-by-play spot. Ryan Ruocco substitutes for Eagle during the latter's CBS NFL and NCAA commitments.

As of 2021, Sarah Kustok and Richard Jefferson provide color commentary on YES Network broadcasts, and Michael Grady serves as courtside reporter.

Radio
WFAN is the Nets' current radio flagship, the station having assumed radio rights from WOR following the 2003–04 season. Chris Carrino and Tim Capstraw comprise the broadcast team, Carrino on play-by-play and Capstraw as the analyst. The games air on other Entercom-operated stations, such as WCBS (AM) and WXBK, when there are programming conflicts on WFAN.

Other broadcasters who have worked for the Nets include Howard David, Bob Papa, Bill Raftery, Kelly Tripucka, Albert King, Mike O'Koren, Spencer Ross, Mel Proctor, Joe Tait, John Sterling, John Minko and Mark Jackson.

Nets games have also aired on WNEW and WQEW in the past.

During the club's ABA years, announcers included Marty Glickman, Marv Albert's brothers Al Albert and Steve Albert, baseball Hall of Fame pitcher Bob Gibson, Bob Goldsholl, as well as Sterling and Vince DiTomasso. The latter two joined the club's move into the NBA.

References
Notes

Sources

External links

 

 
American Basketball Association teams
National Basketball Association teams
Basketball teams established in 1967
1967 establishments in New Jersey
New Jersey Nets
Nets
YES Network
Forest City Realty Trust